The Bungsberg telecommunications tower, also known as the Fernmeldeturm Schönwalde, is a 179-metre-high telecommunications tower situated on the Bungsberg, a hill which (at 168 metres above mean sea level) is the highest point in the north German state of Schleswig-Holstein.

The tower, which belongs to Deutsche Telekom, is used for directional radio links, FM radio and television transmissions (see the list of frequencies below) and mobile telephony services. Constructed of concrete, weighing some 6000 tonnes, and having a diameter at its base of 8.4 metres, the tower is equipped with a public observation deck at a height of 40 metres, accessible by an internal staircase. 

The telecommunications tower was not the first tower incorporating a viewing platform to be erected on the Bungsberg. An 18-metre-high observation tower, the Elisabethenturm, had been built earlier, in 1861. This tower, extended to a height of 22 metres in 1864, is still standing, although closed to the public since the opening of the telecommunications tower.

Transmitted Programmes

Telecommunication Tower Bungsberg is used for transmitting the 2 and 3rd German TV-programme and the programmes of privately owned TV stations.

NDR-transmitter

Close to Telecommunication Tower Bungsberg the NDR operates since 1960 a transmission site. It uses in opposite 
to the site of the Deutsche Telekom a 231 metre tall guyed mast, which is the tallest structure in Schleswig Holstein. Between 1960 and 2005 a guyed steel tube mast was in use. As
this mast was not capable to carry antennas for DVB-T, it was replaced in 2004 by a guyed lattice steel mast of the same height
nearby. The old mast was dismantled in 2006.

This mast is used for transmitting the first program of NDR and the following FM-radio programmes of NDR.

References
  — Telecommunication Tower
 Entry of Telecommunication Tower Bungsberg at Skyscraperpage
  —  old NDR transmission mast
 Entry of old NDR transmission mast Bungsberg at Skyscraperpage
  — new NDR transmission mast
 Entry of new NDR transmission mast Bungsberg at Skyscraperpage

Google Map Views
 Telecommunication Tower Bungsberg on Google Maps
 NDR-transmitter on Google Maps

Communication towers in Germany
Observation towers